The Central District of Behshahr County is a district (bakhsh) in Behshahr County, Mazandaran Province, Iran. At the 2006 census, its population was 144,332, in 37,603 families.  The District has three cities: Behshahr, Khalil Shahr, and Rostamkola. The District has three rural districts (dehestan): Kuhestan Rural District, Miyan Kaleh Rural District, and Panj Hezareh Rural District.

References 

Behshahr County
Districts of Mazandaran Province